Mraclin is a village in Croatia approximately 20 kilometers south of Zagreb, near the city of Velika Gorica.

The name of Mraclin was documented as early as 1249 and 1255, as Mrachlin. The toponym is likely derived from the names of either Martinus or Marcellus, who could have been landowners in the area, or saints with a local church dedicated to them. Mraclin's church of St. Vitus was established between 1642 and 1688.

References

Bibliography

External links

Populated places in Zagreb County
Velika Gorica